The Twenty-Fifth Wisconsin Legislature convened from  to  in regular session.

This was the first legislative session after the redistricting of the Senate and Assembly according to an act of the previous session.

Senators representing even-numbered districts were newly elected for this session and were serving the first year of a two-year term. Assembly members were elected to a one-year term. Assembly members and even-numbered senators were elected in the general election of November 7, 1871. Senators representing odd-numbered districts were serving the second year of their two-year term, having been elected in the general election held on November 8, 1870.

Major events
 January 1, 1872: Inauguration of Cadwallader C. Washburn as 11th Governor of Wisconsin.
 March 1, 1872: Yellowstone National Park was established as the first national park.
 May 22, 1872: President Ulysses S. Grant signed the Amnesty Act, restoring full civil rights to about 500 Confederate sympathizers.
 November 5, 1872: Ulysses S. Grant re-elected as President of the United States.  Susan B. Anthony voted illegally in the election.

Major legislation
 February 6, 1872: Joint Resolution instructing our senators and requesting our representatives in congress to oppose the passage of a bill for the remission of import duties on building material to be used in rebuilding the burnt district of Chicago, 1872 Joint Resolution 1.  Opposed the lifting of tariffs on foreign timber and building materials, a move that was contemplated to aide in the reconstruction of Chicago after the Great Chicago Fire.  
 February 14, 1872: An Act to prohibit and prevent the carrying of concealed weapons, 1872 Act 7.
 March 5, 1872: An Act making election days legal holidays, 1872 Act 32.
 March 9, 1872: An Act to apportion the state of Wisconsin into congressional districts, 1872 Act 48.  Wisconsin's congressional delegation grew from six to eight members.
 March 15, 1872: An Act to protect the use of the telegraph, 1872 Act 54.  To outlaw the act of intercepting a telegraph intended for another recipient.
 March 21, 1872: An Act to amend section two of chapter one hundred and fifty-six of the general laws of 1871, entitled "an act to apportion the state of Wisconsin into senate and assembly districts," 1872 Act 70. Reconfigured the Monroe County Assembly districts.
 March 21, 1872: An Act authorizing cities and villages to establish free public libraries and reading rooms, 1872 Act 80.
 March 22, 1872: Joint Resolution to amend section three (3) of article eleven (11) of the constitution, 1872 Joint Resolution 11.  Proposed an amendment to the state constitution to prohibit counties, municipalities, and school districts from going into debt.
 March 22, 1872: An Act to provide for the improvement of the capitol park, 1872 Act 93.
 March 23, 1872: An Act to submit to the people an amendment to article seven of the constitution, 1872 Act 111.  Setting a referendum for an amendment to the state constitution expanding the Supreme Court from three to five justices.  The referendum ultimately failed in the November 1872 general election.
 March 25, 1872: An Act to enable married women to transact business, make contracts, and sue and be sued, and to define the liabilities of husbands and wives, 1872 Act 155.

Party summary

Senate summary

Assembly summary

Sessions
 1st Regular session: January 10, 1872March 26, 1872

Leaders

Senate leadership
 President of the Senate: Milton Pettit (R)
 President pro tempore: Charles G. Williams (R)

Assembly leadership
 Speaker of the Assembly: Daniel Hall (R)

Members

Members of the Senate
Members of the Senate for the Twenty-Fifth Wisconsin Legislature:

Members of the Assembly
Members of the Assembly for the Twenty-Fifth Wisconsin Legislature:

Changes from the 24th Legislature
New districts for the 25th Legislature were defined in 1871 Wisconsin Act 156, passed into law in the 24th Wisconsin Legislature.

Senate redistricting

Summary of changes
 17 Senate districts were left unchanged (or were only renumbered).
 The Dane County district boundaries were slightly redrawn and renumbered (7, 26).
 Dodge County went from having two senators to one (13).
 Fond du Lac County went from having one senator to two (18, 20).
 Kenosha and Walworth counties were combined into one district (8).
 La Crosse County became its own senate district (31), after previously having been in a shared district with Vernon county.
 The Milwaukee County district boundaries were slightly redrawn and renumbered (3, 6).
 Outagamie County was split between two multi-county districts (21, 22).
 Ozaukee and Washington counties were combined into one district (33).
 The old multi-county 32nd Senate district was split into two districts (30, 32).

Senate districts

Assembly redistricting

Summary of changes
 Adams and Wood counties became a combined district, Wood had previously been in a shared district with Marathon County, Adams had previously been its own Assembly district.
 Brown County went from having 2 districts to 3.
 Chippewa County became its own assembly district, after previously having been in a shared district with Dunn.
 Dane County went from having 5 districts to 4.
 Dodge County went from having 4 districts to 6.
 Eau Claire County became its own assembly district, after previously having been in a shared district with Pepin County.
 Fond du Lac County went from having 6 districts to 3.
 Grant County went from having 5 districts to 4.
 Jefferson County went from having 4 districts to 3.
 La Crosse County went from having 2 districts to 1.
 Lafayette County went from having 2 districts to 1.
 Milwaukee County went from having 10 districts to 11.
 Richland County went from having 1 district to 2.
 Washington County went from having 3 districts to 2.
 Waukesha County went from having 3 districts to 2.

Assembly districts

References

External links
 1872: Related Documents from Wisconsin Legislature

1872 in Wisconsin
Wisconsin
Wisconsin legislative sessions